The Prince of Pilsen is a lost 1926 American silent romantic comedy film directed by Paul Powell and starring Anita Stewart and George Sidney. David Belasco produced the film. It was based on a 1903 Broadway musical, The Prince of Pilsen, by Gustav Luders.

The film was parodied by Mack Sennett that same year as The Prince of Pilsener.

Cast

References

External links

1926 films
American silent feature films
American films based on plays
Lost American films
Films directed by Paul Powell (director)
American romantic comedy films
1926 romantic comedy films
American black-and-white films
Films set in Europe
Producers Distributing Corporation films
1926 lost films
1920s American films
Silent romantic comedy films
Silent American comedy films